Fort McPherson National Cemetery is a United States National Cemetery, located  south of the village of Maxwell in Lincoln County, Nebraska. Administered by the United States Department of Veterans Affairs, it encompasses , and as of 2014, it had over 10,000 interments.

History 
Fort McPherson was established in 1863 as an outpost to protect travellers along the Oregon and California Trails, and to keep the peace with the local Native Americans. It was named for Major General James B. McPherson, who was killed in action at the Battle of Atlanta. A cemetery was created along with the fort. In 1873,  were set aside to be a National Cemetery, and the remains interred in the original post cemetery were moved to it.

Twenty-three cemeteries were moved from abandoned frontier forts to Fort McPherson; the last of these was moved from Fort Robinson when it was closed in 1947.

Monuments 
 A marble monument, erected in memory of those killed at the Grattan massacre.

Notable interments 
 Medal of Honor recipients
 Private First Class James W. Fous (1946–1968), for action in the Vietnam War
 Sergeant George Jordan (1847–1904), for action in New Mexico Territory during the Indian Wars
 Private Daniel Miller (1841–1874), for action in Arizona Territory during the Indian Wars
 Sergeant Emanuel Stance (1843–1887), for action in Texas during the Indian Wars
 Others
 California Joe Milner (1829–1876), Western miner and frontier scout
 63 Buffalo soldiers

References

External links

 National Cemetery Administration
 Fort McPherson National Cemetery
 
 
 

1863 establishments in Nebraska Territory
Cemeteries on the National Register of Historic Places in Nebraska
Federal lands in Nebraska
Protected areas of Lincoln County, Nebraska
United States national cemeteries
Historic American Landscapes Survey in Nebraska
National Register of Historic Places in Lincoln County, Nebraska
1873 establishments in Nebraska